Lisa Ryder (born 26 October 1970) is a Canadian actress, who portrayed the role of Beka Valentine on the science fiction television series Andromeda.

Life and career
Ryder was born in Edmonton, Alberta and attended the University of Toronto, where she began acting. She formed a local theatre group, Bald Ego Productions, in Toronto after graduation and landed her first film and television roles in the mid-1990s.  She starred in many theatre productions, including "Put Me Away," a one-woman show which she wrote. She gained a following as Detective Tracy Vetter on the final season of the vampire drama Forever Knight in 1995–1996 and was cast on the syndicated science-fiction series Andromeda in 2000; the series ended in 2005 after 110 episodes. She also co-starred, as android Kay-Em 14, in the 2001 film Jason X, starring Andromeda alumnus Lexa Doig (notable is the role reversal).

Ryder guest-starred in Gene Roddenberry's Earth: Final Conflict, Total Recall 2070, Kung Fu: The Legend Continues, Wind at My Back and Psi Factor: Chronicles of the Paranormal. She also had a recurring role on The Newsroom. Her other movie roles include the critically acclaimed Canadian indie film Stolen Heart, the thriller Blackheart and the short films Strands and Lemon.  She also wrote, produced and starred in the film SF Seeks, featuring Michael Shanks, Gordon Michael Woolvett, Keith Hamilton Cobb and Lexa Doig. She appeared in a television advert for Cheer laundry detergent in the late 80s – early 90s.

In 2014, Ryder starred in the Canadian Stage co-production of Helen Lawrence. In 2019, Ryder's play A Blow in the Face premiered with Nightwood Theatre and Bald Ego Theatre in Toronto, Ontario. The play was inspired by her personal experiences with postpartum depression after the birth of her first child. In the premiere, Ryder played the roofer Cloudy.

Filmography

Film

Television

References

External links
 

1970 births
Actresses from Edmonton
Canadian film actresses
Canadian television actresses
Living people
University of Toronto alumni